Assiniboine Park (formerly known as City Park) is a park in Winnipeg, Manitoba, Canada, located along the Assiniboine River.

The Winnipeg Public Parks Board was formed in 1893, and purchased the initial land for the park in 1904. Although in use before then, the park officially opened in 1909. It is named for the Assiniboine people.

The park includes the  Assiniboine Forest, Assiniboine Park Zoo, Assiniboine Park Conservatory, the historic Assiniboine Park Pavilion, formal and informal gardens, a sculpture garden, a miniature railway, an outdoor theatre for performing arts, and numerous other attractions.

Prominent attractions
CN U-1-d Mountain numbered 6043 is on display

Conservatory and gardens
One of the earliest park features and a major indoor attraction, The Conservatory is a botanical garden housing more than 8,000 flowers, plants and trees that are non-native to Manitoba, but which grow profusely under the ideal conditions created in the Palm House and Display Garden. The original Palm House was erected in 1914, and in 1968 a fully modern structure was built over and around the Palm House, enclosing it.

It was announced in early 2018 that the Assiniboine Park Conservatory would close permanently in April 2018 due to ongoing renovation costs and it reaching the end of its "useful life". The building has since been demolished, and usage of the existing space has not been determined. In 2018 a group of citizens spoke out about the future Diversity Gardens, that visitors will have to pay an admission fee like at the Zoo, and that this will cause lower income citizens to be unable to afford to visit the new displays.

Known throughout North America for its luxuriant display of thousands of annual and perennial flowers, the English Garden (established between 1926 and 1927) contains nearly 3 acres of flowers, shrubs and trees arranged in the traditional English style. From the outset, the English Garden was designed to serve as a popular park attraction where local residents and tourists could obtain information about specialized floriculture in Manitoba. New plant varieties have been introduced annually. A large rose garden (with more than 400 bushes (there are only a few remnants of roses in this area.) of Floribunda, Grandiflora and Rugosa varieties), broken into four sections, surrounds a central, fish-filled lily pond. (No roses exist in this area, the central pond has a large fountain in it, no fish or lilies exist.)

The English Garden is open free of charge to the public every day of the year.

The Formal Garden, located at the southeast park entrance, was designed in 1907 by Frederick Todd as part of the original park. It features flower beds in sharply defined geometric shapes that stand out from the grassy areas. Each of the beds, as well as the overall design, is symmetrical.

The Leo Mol Sculpture Garden displays more than three hundred works by Dr. Leo Mol, including bronze and ceramic sculptures, paintings and drawings. Opened in 1992, the sculpture garden has been expanded twice since.

Pavilion and theatre

The park's signature feature, the Assiniboine Park Pavilion became a focus of early Winnipeg's social life. Originally designed by John D. Atchison and built in 1908, it included a dance hall, a banquet hall, lunch and catering. The  tower contained the pump and water tower for the park's water system. It was destroyed by fire in May 1929. The current larger pavilion was designed by architects Northwood and Chivers, and was opened in May 1930. It is today one of Winnipeg's most familiar landmarks.

The Lyric Theatre is a large outdoor stage located next to the Pavilion. Opened in 1999, it carries on the tradition of bandshell entertainment near the Pavilion that started in the 1920s.

Zoo 

The  Assiniboine Park Zoo is at the western end of the park just north of the main parking area, and is home to over 300 animal species. It initially opened in July 1908.

Foot bridge 
The first foot bridge across the Assiniboine River was built in 1908 when the Park had initially opened. However, in later years it was determined that a wider and safer bridge would be needed.

A second bridge, connecting the district of St. James (at Overdale St.) with Assiniboine Park, is an active transportation/pedestrian bridge, and officially opened in May 1932 by Winnipeg mayor Ralph Webb. A small (2-hectare) portion of the park lies north of the Assiniboine River, and together with the footbridge, provides access to the main body of the park from Portage Avenue.

Children's Nature and Adventure Playground 
Opened in May 2011 as part of the Park's redevelopment, a  Children's Nature and Adventure Playground was built as a children's play area. It is located adjacent to the Pavilion and cost $6 million. The play area features a kid-size doorway, although adult throughway is also provided. The relocated Winnie-the-Pooh statue is inside the Nature Playground area.

Other 
Adjacent to Roblin Boulevard, the last steam locomotive to run scheduled service in Canada, CNR 6043, Class U-1-d, 4-8-2, is on permanent display courtesy of the Winnipeg Railway Museum. A  narrow gauge railway named Assiniboine Park Railroad operates in one section of the park, which features a working steam locomotive made by Crown Metal Products.

Toward the north of the park, and just to one side of the pedestrian footbridge from Portage Avenue is the serpentine duck pond. Originally a fenced area, in the 2010s the duck pond was upgraded with new plants and benches. Although called a duck pond, it is more common to find Canada geese swimming there.

The park also includes picnic areas.

Sports

The park offers playgrounds, a bicycle path, baseball and cricket fields with three cricket pitches (upper and lower grounds) and a clubhouse on site. The park is the Manitoba Cricket League's premier facility for hosting club cricket.

The Terry Fox Fitness Trail, dedicated to the Canadian humanitarian's memory, is designed for disabled and non-disabled individuals alike. Assiniboine Park is wheelchair-accessible.

Assiniboine Park Riparian Forest Project

The Assiniboine Park Riparian Forest Project purposes to help the riparian forest recover from heavy use and enhance the recreational trail experience. The ongoing riverbank restoration project, begun in 2006, continues each summer.

The project concerns the strip of forest along the Assiniboine River within Assiniboine Park, a well-known and much-loved recreational area just east of the footbridge on the south side of Portage Avenue. Over many years, the forest has suffered a loss of vegetation due to flooding, invasive plant species that replace native species, and trampling from recreational activities such as hiking and biking. Generations of heavy usage has resulted in the creation of an extensive trail network, soil compaction and large areas of bare ground.

Restoration is underway in the forest through careful planning, cooperation from trail-users and efforts such as tree planting, invasive species removal and creating a main trail. The project's aim is that by reducing the impact of recreation in the forest, this natural area will still be around for generations to enjoy 100 years from now.

Gallery

See also
List of botanical gardens in Canada
Winnipeg arts and culture

Further reading 
Spector, David (2019). Assiniboine Park: Designing and Developing a People's Playground. Great Plains Publications.

References

External links
Assiniboine Park (official website)

Parks in Winnipeg
Tourist attractions in Winnipeg
Cricket grounds in Canada
Sports venues in Winnipeg
Venues of the 1999 Pan American Games
1904 establishments in Manitoba
Botanical gardens in Canada
Buildings and structures in Winnipeg
Tuxedo, Winnipeg